Keed Talk to 'Em 2 is the fifth mixtape and first posthumous release by American rapper Lil Keed, released on March 17, 2023, by YSL Records and 300 Entertainment.

Singles 
"Long Way to Go" was released on February 3, 2023 as the lead single to the album. On March 13, 2023, the second single "Self Employed" was released.

Track listing

References

2023 mixtape albums
Lil Keed albums